Francisco Iglesias (born 16 December 1964) is a Spanish wrestler. He competed at the 1984 Summer Olympics, the 1988 Summer Olympics and the 1992 Summer Olympics.

References

1964 births
Living people
Spanish male sport wrestlers
Olympic wrestlers of Spain
Wrestlers at the 1984 Summer Olympics
Wrestlers at the 1988 Summer Olympics
Wrestlers at the 1992 Summer Olympics
People from Palencia
Sportspeople from the Province of Palencia
20th-century Spanish people
21st-century Spanish people